Lionel Algernon White (9 November 1850 – 25 June 1917) was an English cricketer active in first-class cricket in 1869. Born at Wateringbury, Kent, White was a right-handed batsman.

White made his debut in first-class cricket for Kent County Cricket Club in 1869 against Sussex, which he followed up with three further first-class appearances, playing twice against Nottinghamshire and once against Surrey. White scored 84 runs in his four matches, with a highest score of 34.

He died at Tunbridge Wells in June 1917. His cousin Edward White was also a first-class cricketer.

References

External links

1850 births
1917 deaths
People from Wateringbury
English cricketers
Kent cricketers